Annie on My Mind is a 1982 novel by Nancy Garden about the romantic relationship between two 17-year-old New York City girls, Annie and Liza.

Characters

Liza Winthrop: The protagonist and narrator of the novel, Liza is a 17-year-old girl living in the upscale neighborhood of Brooklyn Heights. She, along with her younger brother, Chad, attends Foster Academy, a private school nearby, which is facing financial trouble, and is the student council president there. She is desperate to become an architect at MIT, similar to her father, who is an engineer that studied there.

Annie Kenyon: Annie, also 17, lives "far uptown" in a shabby neighborhood. She lives with her father and grandmother, who were both Italian immigrants, and her American mother. She loves plants, is a brilliant singer, and misses her home from when she was young in San Francisco.

Ms. Isabelle Stevenson: Ms. Stevenson is Liza's art teacher at Foster Academy, who is deeply involved in the school's extracurriculars, and lives with her fellow teacher, Ms. Widmer, who it turns out is her partner.

Ms. Katherine Widmer: Ms. Widmer is Liza's English teacher, inspires and looks after her students, and lives with Ms. Stevenson (who's secretly her partner).

Sally Jarrell: Sally attends Foster Academy, and is a close friend of Liza. She and her boyfriend, Walt, who also attends the school, become the student leaders of the drive to help Foster Academy's financial difficulties.

Mrs. Poindexter: Mrs. Poindexter is the very conservative and traditional headmistress of Foster Academy.

Plot summary

Liza Winthrop first meets Annie Kenyon at the Metropolitan Museum of Art on a rainy day. The two become fast friends, although they come from different backgrounds and have differing levels of confidence.

Liza is the student body president at her private school, Foster Academy, where she is studying hard to get into MIT and become an architect. She lives with her parents and younger brother in the upscale neighborhood of Brooklyn Heights, where most residents are professionals. While at school, Liza fails to stop a friend and classmate, Sally Jarrell, from running her amateur ear-piercing business in the school basement, causing Liza and Sally to be reprimanded by the headmistress, Mrs. Poindexter.

Annie goes to a public school and lives with her parents—a bookkeeper and a cabdriver—and grandmother in a lower-income part of Manhattan. Although Annie is not sure if she will be accepted, she hopes to attend the University of California, Berkeley to develop her talent as a singer.

While they have different histories and goals in life, the two girls do share a close friendship that quickly grows into love. Liza's school is struggling to remain open and she finds herself having to defend a student, her friend Sally, in a school trial in front of the student body. This results in a three-day school suspension for Liza and helps to bring Liza and Annie closer together as they both deal with the struggles encountered by many high school students.

The suspension and the partly concomitant Thanksgiving break give the girls time to become closer and lead to their first kiss. Annie admits that she has thought that she may be gay. Liza soon realizes that although she has always considered herself different, she has not considered her sexual orientation until falling in love with Annie.

When two of Liza's female teachers (who live together), Ms. Stevenson and Ms. Widmer, go on vacation during spring break, she volunteers for the job of taking care of their home and feeding their cats. The two girls stay at the house together, but in an unexpected turn of events a Foster Academy administrator discovers Liza and Annie together. Liza is forced to tell her family about her relationship with Annie, and the headmistress of her school, Mrs. Poindexter, organizes a meeting of the school's board of trustees in order to expel Liza. The board rules in favor of Liza staying at Foster, and she is allowed to keep her position as student president. However, the two teachers, Ms. Stevenson and Ms. Widmer, who in the process are discovered to be gay, are fired, as a result of Sally's wrongful testimony about their influence on Liza. After their initial shock at discovering the girls together, the teachers are very supportive and go out of their way to reassure Liza not to worry about their dismissal, but both her family's response and those from fellow students end up pushing Liza to leave Annie.

The girls go their separate ways to colleges on different coasts. In a happily ever after, Liza's reevaluation of her relationship while at college and her corresponding acceptance of her sexual orientation allow the two girls to reunite.

The book is framed and narrated by Liza's thoughts as she attempts to write Annie a letter, in response to the many letters Annie has sent her. This narration comes right before the winter break of both their colleges' and Liza is unable to write or mail the letter she had been working on. Instead she calls Annie, and the two reconcile and decide to meet together before going home for winter break.

Publication
The novel was originally published in 1982 by Farrar, Straus & Giroux. Since then, it has never been out of print.

Editions of the book include the following:

Cover art
Changes in cover art throughout the years has reflected the change in attitudes towards gay people, according to the author. The original cover illustration showed Annie, in a black cloak, and Liza, standing away from Annie, on the Esplanade in Brooklyn overlooking the harbor. Garden commented that "it really looks as if Annie is going to swoop down on Liza—almost like a vampire attacking". Although this cover was never used, future covers failed to show the girls relating, Garden said. Garden's preferred cover art, which came out in 1992 and has been reused in more recent publications, shows "the two girls really relating to each other equally," Garden said.

Reception

Praise
The American Library Association designated the book a "Best of the Best Books for Young Adults". The School Library Journal included the book in its list of the 100 most influential books of the 20th century. It was selected to the 1982 Booklist Reviewer's Choice, the 1982 American Library Association Best Books, and the ALA Best of the Best lists (1970–1983).
The Young Adult Library Services Association, a division of the American Library Association, gave Nancy Garden its Margaret A. Edwards Award for Lifetime Achievement for Annie on My Mind in 2003.

Criticism
The book is #48 on The 100 Most Frequently Challenged Books during the period 1990 to 2000, according to the American Library Association. It ranked No. 44 on the ALA's 1990 to 1999 list.

Kansas City controversy

In 1993, the LGBT organization Project 21 donated Annie on My Mind, along with Frank Mosca's All-American Boys, to 42 high schools in the Kansas City area. Because both books included homosexual themes, some parents objected that the books were made available to high school students.

During the controversy, copies of the book were burned.

Around the time the incident happened, author Nancy Garden was at a writers' conference. When asked if she had had trouble with Annie on My Mind she said no. Soon after, she learned of the burning when she received a call from Stephen Friedman, who asked, "Did you know your book has just been burned in Kansas City?"

Garden commented on the incident,

On December 13, 1993, superintendent Ron Wimmer, of the Olathe (Kansas) School District, ordered the book removed from the high school library. Wimmer said he made his decision in order to "avoid controversy", such as the public book burning.

The Olathe School District refused to accept copies of the book, removing a copy that had sat on its shelf for over ten years. In response, the American Civil Liberties Union joined several families and a teacher and sued the school district for removing the book.

Two years later in September 1995, the case went to trial. In November 1995, US District Court Justice Thomas Van Bebber ruled that while a school district is not obligated to purchase any book, it cannot remove a book from library shelves unless that book is deemed educationally unsuitable. He ruled Annie on My Mind to be educationally suitable, and called its removal an unconstitutional attempt to "prescribe what shall be orthodox in politics, nationalism, religion, or other matters of opinion".

On December 29, 1999, the school district announced it would not appeal the court's decision, and restored Annie on My Mind to library shelves. The entire proceeding had cost the district over $160,000.

After the banning controversy, author Nancy Garden became a spokesperson on behalf of children's intellectual freedom as readers. This earned her Robert B. Downs Intellectual Freedom Award in 2000.

Adaptations

In 1991, as part of BBC Radio 5's programming for gay teenagers, producer Anne Edyvean directed a dramatization of the novel, written by Sarah Daniels.

In 1994, Kim J. Smith collaborated with Nancy Garden to write a play based on her novel. The play premiered on November 4, 1994, at the Renegade Theatre in Lawrence, Kansas. Fred Phelps and some of his followers picketed the event. The play was the only production of the Renegade Youth Theatre's "Banned Book Theatre".

See also

Lesbian teen fiction
LGBT literature
List of most commonly challenged books in the U.S.

References

External links 

1980s LGBT novels
1982 American novels
American LGBT novels
American novels adapted into plays
American young adult novels
Novels adapted into radio programs
Novels with lesbian themes
Lesbian teen fiction
Novels set in New York City
LGBT-related young adult novels
LGBT-related controversies in literature
Farrar, Straus and Giroux books
Censored books
Young adult romance literature